George Enoch Stanley (1884-1949) was a British motorcyclist who was a member of ‘The British Motorcycle Racing Club’.

History

From 1909 to 1911 he rode a Premier motorcycle then from 1911 to 1914 he rode a three and a half horsepower single cylinder Singer motorcycle and lastly he rode a Triumph. George broke the one-hour record at Brooklands race track on a Singer motorcycle in 1912, becoming the first ever rider of a 350 cc motorcycle to cover over 60 miles (97 km) in an hour. George was born in Wolverhampton, England in 1884 and died on 4 June 1949 in a cemetery in Beddgelert. George had four children named Kenneth, Victor, Graham, Roy and his second wife called Kate. His father was Enoch Stanley and George's uncle was William Stanley who set up the English football team, Coventry City. George’s nickname was ‘The Wizard’.

In 1913, there was a short newspaper article about him, it read: "George E. Stanley, Engineer, in Wolver-Hampton. - Probably- the most outstanding rider in years just preceding the war, Stanley, will long be remembered as ‘The Wizard’. By super-tuning and brilliant riding he was one of the most successful riders of 1910-1913 periods, His 350cc hour record (63.39 mph) on a Singer stood from October, 1913, to November 1920, and his 500cc hour record (72.48 mph), also on a Singer, from October 1920. He entered the competition world on a Premier".

After motorcycling career, George was a consultant of Singer and a designer. After retiring from consultancy, he moved to Beddgelert in Wales where he met Kate.

Races won
 Distance of 56 miles in one Hour
 Covered a distance of 60 miles and winning the third One Hour Senior
 Covered a distance of 5 miles in 4.34 minutes
1912
 Brooklands Meeting - 2nd
 Brooklands Meeting - 1st
 Brooklands Time Trials - 1st
 Brooklands Time Trials - 1st
 Brooklands Three Lap Scratch Race - 2nd
 Brooklands Meeting - 2nd
 Brooklands Third Meeting - 1st
 Brooklands Flying Mile - 1st
 Brooklands Car Challenge Race - 1st
 Brooklands Meeting - Eighth Short Handicap - 3rd
 Invitation Race - 2nd
 All Comers Race - 1st
 Eight Long Motorcycle Race - 2nd
 Brooklands Flying Kilometre - 2nd
 Brooklands Flying Mile - 2nd
 Brooklands Junior Scratch Race - 1st
 Brooklands Senior Scratch Race - 1st
 Coventry Club's Open Hill Climb - 1st
 Coventry Club's Open Hill Climb - 1st. on time
- 1st. on form
 Coventry Club's Open Hill Climb - 1st. on time
 Coventry Club's Open Hill Climb - 1st. on form
 Brooklands Junior Hour Race - 1st
1913
 Brooklands 3 Lap Scratch - 1st
 Brooklands 3 Lap Scratch - 1st
 Brooklands 3 Lap Handicap - 1st
 Brooklands 3 Lap Handicap - 3rd
 Senior Lap TT - 1st
 Brooklands Time Trials - 1st
 22 Lap Junior TT - 1st
 26 Lap Senior TT - 1st
 3 Lap Scratch - 1st
 3 Lap Scratch - 1st
 3 Lap Handicap - 1st
 3 Lap Hindicap - 1st
 The Daily Express Motorcycle Benzol Race - 1st
 10 Mile Record Race and Sealed Handicap  - 1st
 Junior One Lap Sprint Race - 1st
 Five Lap A.C.U. Championship Race - 3rd
 Junior One Hour A.C.U. Championship Race - 1st

World Records Held
Class "B":
 Flying 5 Miles
 Standard 10 Miles
 50 Miles
 One Hour
Class "C":
 Flying Kilometers
 Flying Mile
 Flying 5 Miles
 Standard 10 Miles
 50 Miles
 One Hour
Class "C":
 Flying Kilometre
 Flying Mile
 Flying 5 Miles
 Standard 10 Miles
 50 Miles
 One Hour

See also
 Brooklands
 Premier Motorcycles
 Triumph Motorcycles

British motorsport people
20th-century British people
1884 births
1949 deaths